Yanko Kirilov (born 10 March 1946) is a former Bulgarian footballer who played as a midfielder.

Career
A product of Levski Sofia's youth system, Kirilov made his A Group debut on 18 November 1961 against Minyor Pernik to become the Levski's youngest ever player in the league at the age of 15 years, 8 months and 8 days old.

In 1963, Kirilov joined CSKA Sofia. On 8 September 1965, he scored late winner goal from the penalty spot in CSKA's 3–2 defeat of Levski in the 1965 Bulgarian Cup Final. Kirilov collected his first A Group title winner's medal at the end of the 1965–66 season. He scored 6 league goals in 12 matches that season.

In June 1966, Kirilov returned to Levski Sofia where he won two A Group titles and three Bulgarian Cups in the following six seasons. In 1972, he joined Chernomorets Burgas where he spent three seasons, before retiring as a Levski's player at the age of 32 in 1978.

Honours

Club
CSKA Sofia
A Group: 1965–66
Bulgarian Cup: 1965

Levski Sofia
A Group (2): 1967–68, 1969–70
Bulgarian Cup (3): 1967, 1970, 1971

References

External links
 Player Profile at LevskiSofia.info

1946 births
Living people
Bulgarian footballers
Bulgaria international footballers
Association football midfielders
PFC Levski Sofia players
PFC CSKA Sofia players
FC Chernomorets Burgas players
First Professional Football League (Bulgaria) players
Footballers from Sofia